Julin may refer to:
Julin (surname)
Julin, Warmian-Masurian Voivodeship a settlement in (north Poland)
Julin, a semi-legendary medieval settlement thought to be identical with Jomsborg, Vineta and the modern town of Wolin in north-west Poland
Operation Julin, a series of nuclear tests conducted in 1991–1992 by the United States
Julin Bristol, codename of the nuclear weapon test conducted at the Nevada Test Site on 26 November 1991